Sigismund Felix Freiherr von Ow-Felldorf (18 October 1855 in Berchtesgaden – 11 May 1936 in Passau) was the Bishop of Passau, Germany, from 1907 until his death in 1936.

He was first consecrated by Bishop Ignatius von Senestrey, was ordained a priest on 25 July 1884 and was a parish priest in Regensburg, Germany. On 11 January 1902, aged 46, he was appointed an Auxiliary Bishop of Regensburg and a month later, he was named Titular Bishop of Arethusa. On 18 October 1906, aged 51, he was appointed Bishop of Passau and installed in March 1907. He remained in post until his death on 11 May 1936, aged 80.

He was a priest for 51 years and a bishop for 34 years.

External links 
Catholic Hierarchy biography

1855 births
1936 deaths
Roman Catholic bishops of Passau
People from Berchtesgaden
20th-century German Roman Catholic bishops
20th-century German Roman Catholic priests